The 1954 United States Senate election in Kentucky took place on November 2, 1954. Incumbent Republican Senator John Sherman Cooper, who won a 1952 special election to fill the vacant seat of Virgil Chapman, ran for a full term in office but was defeated by Democratic former Senator and Vice President of the United States Alben Barkley.

General election

Candidates
Alben Barkley, former Vice President of the United States and U.S. Senator
John Sherman Cooper, incumbent Senator since 1952

Results

Aftermath
Following his victory, Barkley served a little over a year before dying of a heart attack on April 30, 1956. Cooper won the November special election to succeed him and returned to the Senate.

See also
1954 United States Senate elections

Notes

References 

1954
Kentucky
United States Senate
Alben W. Barkley